television series is a Japanese crime drama. Originally broadcast between April 2, 1979 and March 17, 1980, lasting 51 episodes, the series featured an all-female cast, not unlike the earlier series Playgirl. Supergirl, however, was primarily based upon the American television series Charlie's Angels and the softcore pornography films produced by Nikkatsu.

Similarities
Despite the superficial similarities, Supergirl is vastly different from Playgirl. Featuring far more serious plots and less comic relief, as well as highly eroticised situations wherein the characters wore a variety of revealing and fetish outfits, including bikinis and schoolgirl uniforms, these elements of the series were a deliberate attempt by its producer Toei to create a more "adult" series. This can even be seen in the episode titles, such as episode one, "Seven Sexy Cats Make Their Explosive Debut", or episode nineteen, "Nude Battle Against the Wolf Pack".

Characters and cast
The main characters of the series are members of "SG7" (short for Super Girl Seven), an all-female detective agency. Their leader was portrayed by Yōko Nogiwa; the other primary actors in the series are Janet Hatta, Linda Yamamoto, Rei Maki, Reiko Itsuki, Jun Izumi, Naomi Tanaka, Emi Shindo, and Akiko Hyuga.

Yuko Hirose (Yoko Nogiwa) cool-headed leader
Ritsuko Emoto (Janet Hatta) field commander (episodes 1-25)
Mari Fujimura (Linda Yamamoto) intelligence gatherer and informant (episodes 1-24, 26, 32, 39)
Rie Hase (Rei Maki) wild cat
Kaoru Sakaki (Reiko Itsuki) cry baby
Mika Shiraishi (Jun Izumi) troublemaker
Etsuko Namiki (Naomi Tanaka) youngest
Noriko Hayakawa (Emi Shindo) undercover specialist (from episode 26)
Mayumi Mizuki (Akiko Hyuga) sukeban (juvenile) idol (from episode 26)
Chief Detective Komada (Kanichi Tani) Former boss of Yuko Hirose

References

External links
 

1970s Japanese television series
1980s Japanese television series
1979 Japanese television series debuts
1980 Japanese television series endings
Japanese crime television series
Japanese detective television drama series